Gunnar Studenhofft (born 5 April 2002) is a Caymanian footballer who currently plays for the EFSC Titans and the Cayman Islands national team.

Youth career
Studenhofft began playing football at age 3. For the 2014-15 season he was the top scorer for the islands' U13 Gold League with Elite SC.

In 2016 Studenhofft was part of the Academy SC squad that competed in the Cayman Airways Invitational U14 tournament. Other notable teams competing in the tournament were the academies of  Seattle Sounders FC from the USA, Gillingham FC and Tottenham Hotspur from the UK, and Cavalier F.C. and Harbour View FC from Jamaica. He went on to be the team's top scorer in the tournament with three goals, including his team's only tally in a 1–5 defeat to Harbour View FC. Because of his performance in the tournament he was invited to spend time in England with the under-14 team of Manchester City of the English Premier League.

The following year he helped Academy SC advance to the final of the under-17 FA Cup with two goals against Cayman Athletic SC in the semi-final. Also in 2017 Studenhofft helped his school team, Grace Academy, win its division final and secure the championship. He was then named MVP of the division. Shortly thereafter he was named Player of the Week for the CIFA Boys’ Under-15 League after scoring four goals in a match for Cayman Athletic SC.

In 2018 he moved to central Florida to study and play football at Windermere Preparatory School. At that time he also played for the local Rush Soccer Academy. For the 2019/2020 season, Studenhofft scored a hattrick against All Saints' Academy in the final of the Sunshine State Athletic Conference to help win the school's first-ever title. That season he scored over thirty goals for the team.

College career
For the 2021 season, Studenhofft began playing college soccer in the United States for the Titans of Eastern Florida State College. During his first season with the club he scored two goals in five matches. Following the season he was named to the NJCAA Region 8 All-Region team.

Club career
In 2021 Studenhofft joined the academy of Orlando City SC of Major League Soccer. He made two appearances for the club in MLS Next, scoring against Florida Rush SC.

International career
Studenhofft represented the Cayman Islands at the 2017 CONCACAF Boys' Under-15 Championship in Bradenton, Florida. The team won its first two matches, against Aruba and Bonaire. In the first match, Studenhofft scored two of his team's three goals. Following a 4–0 victory over Saint Martin, the Cayman Islands finished first in Group G and advanced to the knockout rounds. Studenhofft scored his team's fourth goal in the match. The Cayman Islands ultimately finished the tournament undefeated, ending with a 2–0 victory over Antigua and Barbuda. Studenhofft assisted on his team's second goal of the match.

In 2019 Studenhofft was named to the Cayman squad that competed in 2019 CONCACAF U-17 Championship qualifying. The team opened its campaign with a 2–0 victory over Grenada and a 3–0 victory over the United States Virgin Islands but were eliminated in the final match of the Group Stage by eventual group winners Nicaragua. The following year he was part of the under-20 squad that competed in 2020 CONCACAF U-20 Championship qualifying.

He made his senior international debut on 24 March 2021 in a 2022 FIFA World Cup qualification match against Suriname.

International career statistics

Youth international goals
Scores and results list the Cayman Islands' goal tally first.

References

External links
National Football Teams profile
Soccerway profile
EFSC Athletics profile
Manhattan Jaspers profile

2002 births
Living people
Association football forwards
Caymanian footballers
Cayman Islands youth international footballers
Cayman Islands international footballers
Expatriate soccer players in the United States
Caymanian expatriate sportspeople in the United States
Cayman Islands under-20 international footballers